Arthur Essing (15 February 1905 – 28 February 1970) was a German cyclist. He competed in the individual road race at the 1928 Summer Olympics.

References

External links
 

1905 births
1970 deaths
German male cyclists
Olympic cyclists of Germany
Cyclists at the 1928 Summer Olympics
Place of birth missing
Sportspeople from Essen
Cyclists from North Rhine-Westphalia
20th-century German people